The 2021 BET Hip Hop Awards is a recognition ceremony that was held on October 5, 2021 as the 16th installment of the BET Hip Hop Awards. The nominations were announced on September 9, 2021.

Cardi B and Lil Durk lead in nominations, all with 9 nominations each, followed by Drake with 8.

Cardi B and Tyler, the Creator share the most wins with 3 awards each.

Nominees

Hip Hop Artist of the Year 
 Lil Baby
 Cardi B
 Drake
 J. Cole
 Megan Thee Stallion
 Tyler, The Creator

Hip Hop Album of the Year 
 Tyler, The Creator - Call Me If You Get Lost
 Moneybagg Yo – A Gangsta's Pain
 Migos – Culture III
 Megan Thee Stallion – Good News
 DJ Khaled – Khaled Khaled
 21 Savage & Metro Boomin – Savage Mode II
 J. Cole – The Off-Season

Best Hip Hop Video 
 Cardi B featuring Megan Thee Stallion – "WAP"
 Cardi B – "Up"
 Chris Brown & Young Thug – "Go Crazy"
 Drake featuring Lil Durk – "Laugh Now Cry Later"
 Lil Nas X – "Montero (Call Me by Your Name)"
 Saweetie featuring Doja Cat – "Best Friend"

Best Collaboration 
 Cardi B featuring Megan Thee Stallion – "WAP"
 21 Savage & Metro Boomin featuring Drake – "Mr. Right Now"
 Bia featuring Nicki Minaj – "Whole Lotta Money (Remix)"
 DJ Khaled featuring Lil Baby & Lil Durk – "Every Chance I Get"
 Drake featuring Lil Durk – "Laugh Now Cry Later"
 Pooh Shiesty featuring Lil Durk – "Back in Blood"

Best Duo/Group 
 Lil Baby & Lil Durk
 21 Savage & Metro Boomin
 Chris Brown & Young Thug
 City Girls
 Future & Drake
 Migos

Best Live Performer 
 Tyler, The Creator
 Busta Rhymes
 Cardi B
 DaBaby
 Doja Cat
 Megan Thee Stallion

Lyricist of the Year 
 J. Cole
 Benny the Butcher
 Drake
 Lil Baby
 Megan Thee Stallion
 Nas

Video Director of the Year 
 Missy Elliott
 Cole Bennett
 Colin Tilley
 Dave Meyers
 Director X
 Hype Williams

DJ of the Year 
 DJ Scheme
 Chase B
 D-Nice
 DJ Cassidy
 DJ Drama
 DJ Envy
 DJ Jazzy Jeff
 Kaytranada

Producer of the Year 
 Hit-Boy
 DJ Khaled
 Metro Boomin
 Mustard
 The Alchemist
 Tyler, the Creator

Song of the Year 

 "WAP" – Produced by Ayo the Producer & Keyz (Cardi B featuring Megan Thee Stallion)
 "Back in Blood" – Produced by YC (Pooh Shiesty featuring Lil Durk)
 "Late at Night" – Produced by Mustard (Roddy Ricch)
 "Laugh Now Cry Later" – Produced by G. Ry, CardoGotWings, Rogét Chahayed, & Yung Exclusive (Drake featuring Lil Durk)
 "Up" – Produced by Yung DZA, Sean Island, DJ Swanqo (Cardi B)

Best New Hip Hop Artist 
 Yung Bleu
 Don Toliver
 Morray
 Pooh Shiesty

Hustler of the Year 
Saweetie
 Cardi B
 Drake
 Lil Baby
 Megan Thee Stallion
 Yung Bleu

Sweet 16: Best Featured Verse 
 JAY-Z – "What It Feels Like" (Nipsey Hussle & JAY-Z)
 Cardi B – "Type Shit (Migos)
 Drake – "Having Our Way" (Migos)
 Lil Durk – "Back in Blood" (Pooh Shiesty)
 Megan Thee Stallion – "On Me (Remix)" (Lil Baby)
 Roddy Ricch – "Lemonade (Remix)" (Internet Money)

Impact Track 
 Nipsey Hussle & JAY-Z – "What It Feels Like"
 Black Thought – "Thought Vs. Everybody"
 Lil Nas X – "Montero (Call Me by Your Name)"
 Lil Baby & Kirk Franklin – "We Win"
 Meek Mill featuring Lil Durk – "Pain Away"
 Nipsey Hussle & JAY-Z – "What It Feels Like"
 Rapsody – "12 Problems"

Best International Flow 
 Little Simz (United Kingdom)
 Ladipoe (Nigeria)
 Nasty C (South Africa)
 Xamā (Brazil)
 Laylow (France)
 Gazo (France)

Best Hip-Hop Platform 
 Genius
 Complex
 HipHopDX
 HotNewHipHop
 The Breakfast Club
 The Shade Room
 WorldStarHipHop
 XXL

I Am Hip-Hop Award 
 Nelly

Cultural Influence Award 
 Tyler, the Creator

Performers

Presenters
Trina – presented Best New Hip Hop Artist
Remy Ma – presented Best Hip Hop Video
LL Cool J – presented Cultural Influence Award
Rapsody – presented Hip Hop Album of the Year
Jermaine Dupri – presented I Am Hip Hop Award

References 

BET Hip Hop Awards
BET Hip Hop
BET Hip Hop
BET Hip Hop Awards
BET Hip Hop Awards